Phoenix Peak is a peak immediately south of Muskeg Gap at the north end of Sobral Peninsula, Graham Land. The peak is surmounting Mundraga Bay to the west.  Mapped from surveys by Falkland Islands Dependencies Survey (FIDS) (1960–61). Named by United Kingdom Antarctic Place-Names Committee (UK-APC) after the Phoenix Manufacturing Company of Eau Claire, Wisconsin, which started in 1906-07 to design and build steam "locomotive sleds" for hauling logs over ice and snow, probably the earliest successful vehicles of their type.

Mountains of Graham Land
Nordenskjöld Coast